Djoue  is a department of Haut-Ogooué Province in south-eastern Gabon. The capital lies at Onga. It had a population of 2,178 in 2013.

Towns and villages

References

Haut-Ogooué Province
Departments of Gabon